The Gibson Desert is a large desert in Western Australia, largely in an almost "pristine" state. The Gibson Desert is both an interim Australian bioregion and desert ecoregion.

Location and description
The Gibson Desert is located between the saline Kumpupintil Lake and Lake Macdonald along the Tropic of Capricorn, south of the Great Sandy Desert, east of the Little Sandy Desert, and north of the Great Victoria Desert.  The altitude rises to just above  in places. As noted by early Australian explorers such as Ernest Giles large portions of the desert are characterized by gravel-covered terrains covered in thin desert grasses and it also contains extensive areas of undulating red sand plains and dunefields, low rocky/gravelly ridges and substantial upland portions with a high degree of laterite formation. The sandy soil of the lateritic buckshot plains is rich in iron. Several isolated salt-water lakes occur in the centre of the region and to the southwest a system of small lakes follow paleo-drainage features. Groundwater sources include portions of the Officer Basin and Canning Basin.

Climate

Name
The Gibson Desert was named by explorer Ernest Giles after a member of his party, Alfred Gibson, who became lost and presumably died in this desert during an expedition in 1874.

Indigenous habitation
In much of the region, especially the drier western portion, the majority of people living in the area are Indigenous Australians.  In 1984, due to a severe drought which had dried up all of the springs and depleted the bush foods, a group of the Pintupi people who were living a traditional semi-nomadic desert-dwelling life, walked out of a remote wilderness in the central-eastern portion of the Gibson Desert (northeast of Warburton) and made contact for the first time with mainstream Australian society. They are believed to have been perhaps the last uncontacted tribe in Australia.  On the eastern margin of the region, population centres (which include people of European descent) include Warburton, Mantamaru and Warakurna. Young Indigenous adults from the Gibson Desert region work in the Wilurarra Creative programs to maintain and develop their culture.

See also

 Deserts of Australia
 List of deserts by area
 Carnegie expedition of 1896

References

External links

  Gibson Desert 1997 ; a photo album of the Gibson Desert by Stuart Jackson, Verified 2006-01-23
Across Australia Motorbike Tour

Further reading
 Thackway, R and I D Cresswell (1995) An interim biogeographic regionalisation for Australia : a framework for setting priorities in the National Reserves System Cooperative Program Version 4.0 Canberra : Australian Nature Conservation Agency, Reserve Systems Unit, 1995. 

Deserts and xeric shrublands
Deserts of Western Australia
Ecoregions of Western Australia
Ergs
IBRA regions
Goldfields-Esperance